Jiří Přibáň (born 25 August 1967 in Prague) is a Czech academic, author, translator and essayist specializing in the areas of philosophy of law, sociology and politology. He was promoted to a professorship at the Charles University in Prague in 2002. During his career, he published several books. He regularly appears as a political commentator in the mainstream Czech media, such as Czech Television, Hospodářské noviny, and Právo. He also contributed to Journal of Law and Society and to the BBC World Service. He was a member of the Program Council of the Forum 2000 conference.

Přibáň graduated from Charles University in Prague in 1989 and joined Cardiff Law School staff in 2001. He is noted for applying ideas of Niklas Luhmann's system theory on philosophy of law.

In February, 2013, he refused the offer of the President Miloš Zeman to become a constitutional judge.

Selected publications
 Sociologie práva (1996, 2001), SLON (Sociologické nakladatelství),  
 Hranice práva a tolerance (1997), SLON,  
 Rule of Law in Central Europe: the reconstruction of legality, constitutionalism and civil society in the post-Communist countries (1999), Ashgate/Dartmouth, 
 Disidenti práva (2001), SLON,   
 Právo a politika konverzace (2001), G plus G,  
 Systems of Justice in Transition: Central European Experiences Since 1989 (2003), Ashgate Publishing, 
Dissidents of law: on the 1989 revolutions, legitimations, fictions of legality and contemporary version of the social contract, Ashgate Publishing, Aldershot (2002) p. 244 
Legal Symbolism: on law, time and European identity. Ashgate/Aldershot (2007) 
 The Self-Referential European Polity, its legal context and systemic differentiation: theoretical reflections on the emergence of the EU's political and legal autopoiesis. European Law Journal, 15 (4) (2009) pp. 442–461
The Juridification of European Identity, Its Limitations and the Search of EU Democratic Politics. Constellations, 16 (1) (2009) pp. 44–58
From 'Which Rule of Law?' to 'The Rule of Which Law?': Post-Communist Experiences of European Legal Integration. Hague Journal on the Rule of Law, 1 (2) (2009) pp. 337–358
Multiple Sovereignty: on Europe's Self-Constitutionalization and Legal Self-Reference. Ratio Juris, 23 (1) (2010) pp. 41–64
 Obrana ústavnosti (2014), SLON,   
 In Quest of History. On Czech Statehood and Identity . Karolinum Press (2019) . Originally published in Czech as Hledání dějin. O české státnosti a identitě (2018).

References

External links 
Jiri Priban's home page

Charles University alumni
Academics of Cardiff University
Living people
Academic staff of Charles University
1967 births